Association Sportive d'Ariana, often referred to as AS Ariana is a football club from Aryanah in Tunisia. Founded in 1938, the team plays in white, gray and black colors. Their ground is the Municipal Stadium of Ariana, which has a capacity of 7,000.

Football clubs in Tunisia
Association football clubs established in 1938
1938 establishments in Tunisia
Sports clubs in Tunisia